Pungalina is a genus of Australian jumping spiders that was first described by Barry J. Richardson in 2013.

Species
 it contains six species, found in the Northern Territory, Western Australia, Victoria, New South Wales, and Queensland:
Pungalina albobarbata (L. Koch, 1879) – Australia (Queensland, New South Wales)
Pungalina plurilineata Richardson, 2016 – Australia (Queensland, New South Wales, Victoria)
Pungalina semiatra (L. Koch, 1879) – Australia (Queensland, New South Wales)
Pungalina semiferruginea (L. Koch, 1879) – Australia (Queensland, New South Wales)
Pungalina waldockae Richardson, 2016 – Australia (Western Australia)
Pungalina weiri Richardson, 2013 (type) – Australia (Northern Territory)

References

Salticidae genera
Salticidae